This article lists fellows of the Royal Society in health and human sciences.

Clinical endocrinology

Clinical epidemiology

Clinical pathology

Clinical pharmacology

Clinical physiology

References 

Fellows of the Royal Society
Health